Al-Muzayri'a was a Palestinian village in the Ramle Subdistrict. It was depopulated in 1948. In 1998 the new Israeli city of El'ad was built over the ruins.

Location
A wadi ran along its southern part, and separated it from the village of Qula. The village was about 1 km east of the al-Ramla-Haifa railway line. It was also located to the east of the al-Ramla-Jaffa highway.

History
The location has a long history of habitation. A Roman mausoleum, still standing, (about 1 km south of the village site) was converted into a mosque dedicated to a prophet, al-Nabi Yahya ("the Prophet John"). About 1 km northeast of the village was Khirbat Zikhrin, a Roman-Byzantine site that was inhabited during Mamluk and Ottoman periods. The place has been excavated since 1982.

Ottoman era
In 1596, Al-Muzayri'a was part of the Ottoman Empire, nahiya (subdistrict) of Jabel Qubal under the liwa' (district) of Nablus with a population of 7 Muslim households; an estimated population of thirty-nine. The villagers paid a fixed tax rate of 33,3% on a number of crops, including wheat, barley, and olives, as well as goats, and beehives; a total of 1,300 akçe.

The village was possibly abandoned during the 17th century, only to be reoccupied in the 18th century by a family from Dayr Ghassana, named al-Rumayh.

In 1838  el Muzeiri'ah was among the villages Edward Robinson noted from the top of the White Mosque, Ramla, while A. Mansell mentioned passing the village in the early 1860s.

In 1870 Victor Guérin described the village as sitting on a stony hill, he noted that its houses appeared small. An Ottoman village list of about the same year showed that "Mezari"  had 68 houses and a population of 234, though the population count included men, only. It also noted "a very old temple".

In 1882, the PEF's Survey of Western Palestine  described it as "an adobe village on the edge of the hills, near Qula."

British Mandate era
In the 1922 census of Palestine, conducted by the British Mandate authorities, Muzaira'a  had a population of 578, all Muslims, increasing in the 1931 census to 780, still all Muslims, in a total of 186 houses.

In 1919, a school for boys was founded in the village. By 1945, it had become a full-fledged elementary school, with 207 students, including children of the neighboring villages. 35 dunums of land was attached to the school. A school for girls was founded in 1945, and had an initial enrollment of 78 students.

In the 1945 statistics, the village had a population of 1,160, all Muslim, and the total land area was 10,822 dunams. A total of 953 dunums of village land was used for citrus and bananas, 5,895 dunums were used for cereals, 35 dunums were irrigated or used for orchards, while 25 dunams were classified as built-up urban areas.

1948 and aftermath
Al-Muzayri'a was located in the territory allotted to the Arab state under the 1947 UN Partition Plan.
Al-Muzayri was depopulated on 12 July 1948, after Military assault by Israeli forces.

The Israeli moshav of Nehalim was founded in 1949 on the northwestern part of former village land. The moshav of Mazor was founded the same year on the western part of former village land.

The Palestinian historian Walid Khalidi, described the place in 1992: "The site is largely forested. While a few houses remain, most have been reduced to rubble. Cacti and stone terraces are visible on the site."

Gallery

See also
 Depopulated Palestinian locations in Israel
 Mazor Mausoleum

Footnotes

Bibliography

 

 

 
 

   
 

 
 

Mansell, A. L. (1863): "A Surveying Trip through the Holy Land." The Nautical Magazine and Naval Chronicle. January Issue:36–40. Cited in Khalidi, 1992.
  ("c. 180 m west of the mausoleum and east of the hill where a Muslim cemetery is located")

External links
Welcome To al-Muzayri'a
 Muzayri'a, Zochrot
Survey of Western Palestine, Map 14:  IAA, Wikimedia commons 
al-Muzayri'a from the Khalil Sakakini Cultural Center
 Al-Muzer3a  from Dr. Moslih Kanaaneh

Arab villages depopulated during the 1948 Arab–Israeli War
District of Ramla
Philistines